Brugués is a Spanish surname. Notable people with the surname include:

Arnau Brugués Davi (born 1985), retired Spanish tennis player
Eva Fernández Brugués (born 1986), retired Spanish tennis player

Spanish-language surnames